Iván Moreno (born 14 January 1942) is a Chilean sprinter. He competed in the 100 metres at the 1964 Summer Olympics and the 1968 Summer Olympics. In 2022, Moreno won first place in the New York Marathon, category 80-89 years. He completed the 42,195 kilometers in 4 hours, 47 minutes and 17 seconds.

References

1942 births
Living people
Athletes (track and field) at the 1964 Summer Olympics
Athletes (track and field) at the 1968 Summer Olympics
Chilean male sprinters
Olympic athletes of Chile
Athletes (track and field) at the 1967 Pan American Games
Pan American Games competitors for Chile
Sportspeople from Santiago